Helen Craig (born 30 August 1934) is an English children's book illustrator and writer. She is best known for creating the Angelina Ballerina series of children's books with writer Katharine Holabird.

Craig was born in London, evacuated during World War II and educated in Essex, then from 1943 at King Alfred's School in Hertfordshire, then in London. During the 1950s she worked as a portrait photographer in North London, then moved to Spain for 3 years, where she began making ceramic sculptures. Returning to the UK in 1967, she began illustrating children's books in 1970. The first book which she had both written and illustrated was The Mouse House ABC, published in 1977. With co-author Sarah Hayes she created "Bear", a popular children's character who appears in This Is The Bear (1986), This Is The Bear and the Picnic Lunch (1988), and This Is The Bear and the Scary Night (1992). Currently Craig has returned to the medium of sculpture and is making small figurative works.

Craig is the daughter of the film designer and writer Edward Carrick. Her great-grandmother was the stage actress Ellen Terry and her grandfather was theatrical scenic designer Edward Gordon Craig. One of her great-grandfathers was Gaetano Meo (1850–1925) an artist's model, painter and mosaicist, associated with the Pre-Raphelites. In 2018, with the assistance of mosaicist Tessa Hunkin, Craig restored the mosaic gravestone in Hampstead Cemetery which Meo created for his wife Agnes Morton and young son, under which he is also buried.

See also

Terry family

References

External links
Helen Craig  at publisher Penguin Books (US)
 

1934 births
Living people
English illustrators
English writers
Writers from London
Terry family